Maxson may refer to:

Maxson (surname)
Maxson Airfield, an airport in Alexandria Bay, New York, United States

See also
Maxon (disambiguation)